Laemanctus serratus,  also known commonly as the serrated casquehead iguana, is a species of lizard in the family Corytophanidae. The species is native to southeastern Mexico and Central America. There are two recognized subspecies.

Geographic range
L. serratus is found in the Mexican states of Campeche, Chiapas, Hidalgo, Oaxaca, Puebla, Querétaro, Quintana Roo, San Luis Potosí, Tamaulipas, Veracruz, and Yucatán, and also in the countries of Belize, Guatemala, and Honduras.

Habitat
The preferred natural habitat of L. serratus is forest

Description
L. serratus has enlarged triangular scales along the posterior margin of the head casque, and a serrated middorsal crest.

Behavior
L. serratus is diurnal and arboreal.

Reproduction
L. serratus is oviparous.

Subspecies
Two subspecies are recognized as being valid, including the nominotypical subspecies.
Laemanctus serratus alticoronatus 
Laemanctus serratus serratus

References

Further reading
Cope ED (1864). "Contributions to the Herpetology of Tropical America". Proceedings of the Academy of Natural Sciences of Philadelphia [16]: 166–181. (Laemanctus serratus, new species, p. 176).
Cope ED (1866). "Third Contribution to the Herpetology of Tropical America". Proc. Acad. Nat. Sci. Philadelphia [17] ("1865"): 185–198. (Laemanctus alticoronatus, new species, p. 192).
McCoy CJ (1968). "A Review of the Genus Laemanctus (Reptilia: Iguanidae)". Copeia 1968 (4): 665–678.
McCranie JR, Köhler G (2004). "Laemanctus Wiegmann, Casqueheaded Basilisks, Cutetes". Catalogue of American Amphibians and Reptiles 796: 1–5.

Laemanctus
Reptiles described in 1864
Taxa named by Edward Drinker Cope